René Bail (died October 9, 2007) was a Canadian director, cinematographer and actor.

Filmography 
 La Défaite du général Pringle (1952)
 Tan-tan-des-bois (1952)
 Images (Jeux) (1953)
 Chantier (1954)
 Ville Marie, 7 hrs. a.m. (1954)
 Images (1955)
 L'Écurie (1956)
 Mécanique (1956)
 Printemps (1957)
 Les Désoeuvrés (1959)
 Kronos (1961)
 À tout prendre (1963)
 Moi, un jour (1967)
 Le Viol d'une jeune fille douce (1968) 
 Valérie (1968)

References

External links 
 René Bail on IMDB

2007 deaths
20th-century Canadian male actors